The 80th United States Congress was a meeting of the legislative branch of the United States federal government, composed of the United States Senate and the United States House of Representatives. It met in Washington, D.C. from January 3, 1947, to January 3, 1949, during the third and fourth years of Harry S. Truman's presidency. The apportionment of seats in this House of Representatives was based on the 1940 United States census.

The Republicans won the majority in both chambers, marking the first time since the 71st Congress they held full control of Congress, and the first time since the 72nd Congress they held either of the two chambers. This also ended a 14-year Democratic overall federal government trifecta, dating back to the 73rd Congress.

Although the 80th Congress passed a total of 906 public bills, President Truman nicknamed it the "Do Nothing Congress" and, during the 1948 election, campaigned as much against it as against his formal opponent, Thomas E. Dewey. The 80th Congress passed several significant  bills with bipartisan support, most famously the Truman Doctrine, the Marshall Plan, and the Taft–Hartley Act, but it opposed most of Truman's Fair Deal bills.

Major events 

 January 3, 1947: Proceedings of Congress were televised for the first time.
 March 12, 1947: In a Joint Session of Congress, President Truman proclaimed the Truman Doctrine.
 July 18, 1947: The Trust Territory of the Pacific Islands entered into a trusteeship with the United Nations and administered by the United States.
 November 24, 1947: The House of Representatives approved citations of contempt of Congress against the so-called Hollywood 10.
 July 20, 1948: President Truman issued the second peacetime military draft in the United States amid increasing tensions with the Soviet Union.
 July 26, 1948: 
 Turnip Day Session begins, mandated by Truman on July 15, 1948
 President Truman signed Executive Order 9981, ending racial segregation in the United States Armed Forces.
 August 25, 1948: House Un-American Activities Committee held the first-ever televised congressional hearing: "Confrontation Day" between Whittaker Chambers and Alger Hiss.
 November 2, 1948: United States general elections, 1948:
 Presidential election: Harry Truman defeated Thomas E. Dewey, Henry A. Wallace, and Strom Thurmond;
 Democrats regained control of the Senate and the House of Representatives

Major legislation

 May 22, 1947: Assistance to Greece and Turkey Act (Truman Doctrine), Sess. 1, ch. 81, 
 June 23, 1947: Taft–Hartley Act, Sess. 1, ch. 120, 
 July 18, 1947: Presidential Succession Act of 1947, Sess. 1, ch. 264, 
 July 26, 1947: National Security Act of 1947, Sess. 1, ch. 343, 
 August 7, 1947: Mineral Leasing Act for Acquired Lands, Sess. 1, ch. 513, 
 January 27, 1948: United States Information and Educational Exchange Act, Sess. 2, ch. 36, 
 April 3, 1948: Foreign Assistance Act (Marshall Plan), Sess. 2, ch. 169, 
 April 3, 1948: Greek-Turkish Assistance Act of 1948 (Marshall Plan), Sess. 2, ch. 169, Title III, 
 May 26, 1948: Civil Air Patrol Act, Sess. 2, ch. 349, 
 June 12, 1948: Women's Armed Services Integration Act, Sess. 2, ch. 449, 
 June 17, 1948: Reed-Bulwinkle Act, Sess. 2, ch. 491, 
 June 25, 1948: Codify and enact into law Title 3 of the United States CodeThe President, Sess. 2, ch. 644, 
 June 28, 1948: Commodity Credit Corporation Charter Act of 1948, 
 June 30, 1948: Federal Water Pollution Control Act, Sess. 2, ch. 758, 
 July 3, 1948: War Claims Act of 1948, Sess. 2, ch. 826, 
 July 3, 1948: Agricultural Act of 1948, Sess. 2, ch. 827,

Constitutional amendments 
 March 21, 1947: Approved an amendment to the United States Constitution setting a term limit for election and overall time of service to the office of President of the United States, and submitted it to the state legislatures for ratification
 Amendment was later ratified on February 27, 1951, becoming the Twenty-second Amendment to the United States Constitution

Party summary

Senate

House of Representatives 
From the beginning to the end of this Congress, there was no net change in party power.  The Democrats lost one seat, which remained vacant until the next Congress.

Leadership

Senate
 President: Vacant
 President pro tempore: Arthur Vandenberg (R)

Majority (Republican) leadership
 Majority leader: Wallace H. White Jr.
 Majority whip: Kenneth S. Wherry
 Republican Conference Chairman: Eugene Millikin
 Republican Conference Secretary: Milton Young
 National Senatorial Committee Chair: Owen Brewster
 Policy Committee Chairman: Robert A. Taft

Minority (Democratic) leadership
 Minority leader: Alben W. Barkley
 Minority whip: Scott W. Lucas
 Democratic Caucus Secretary: Brien McMahon
 Policy Committee Chairman: Alben W. Barkley

House of Representatives
 Speaker: Joseph W. Martin Jr. (R)

Majority (Republican) leadership
 Majority Leader: Charles A. Halleck
 Republican Whip: Leslie C. Arends
 Republican Conference Chairman: Roy O. Woodruff
 Republican Campaign Committee Chairman: Leonard W. Hall

Minority (Democratic) leadership
 Minority Leader: Sam Rayburn
 Democratic Whip: John W. McCormack
 Democratic Caucus Chairman: Aime Forand
 Democratic Campaign Committee Chairman: Michael J. Kirwan

Caucuses
 House Democratic Caucus
 Senate Democratic Caucus

Members

Senate
Senators are popularly elected statewide every two years, with one-third beginning new six-year terms with each Congress. Preceding the names in the list below are Senate class numbers, which indicate the cycle of their election, In this Congress, Class 2 meant their term ended with this Congress, requiring reelection in 1948; Class 3 meant their term began in the last Congress, requiring reelection in 1950; and Class 1 meant their term began in this Congress, requiring reelection in 1952.

Alabama
 2. John Sparkman (D)
 3. J. Lister Hill (D)

Arizona
 1. Ernest McFarland (D)
 3. Carl Hayden (D)

Arkansas
 2. John L. McClellan (D)
 3. J. William Fulbright (D)

California
 1. William Knowland (R)
 3. Sheridan Downey (D)

Colorado
 2. Edwin C. Johnson (D)
 3. Eugene Millikin (R)

Connecticut
 1. Raymond E. Baldwin (R)
 3. Brien McMahon (D)

Delaware
 1. John J. Williams (R)
 2. C. Douglass Buck (R)

Florida
 1. Spessard Holland (D)
 3. Claude Pepper (D)

Georgia
 2. Walter F. George (D)
 3. Richard Russell Jr. (D)

Idaho
 2. Henry Dworshak (R)
 3. Glen H. Taylor (D)

Illinois
 2. Charles W. Brooks (R)
 3. Scott W. Lucas (D)

Indiana
 1. William E. Jenner (R)
 3. Homer E. Capehart (R)

Iowa
 2. George A. Wilson (R)
 3. Bourke B. Hickenlooper (R)

Kansas
 2. Arthur Capper (R)
 3. Clyde M. Reed (R)

Kentucky
 2. John Sherman Cooper (R)
 3. Alben W. Barkley (D)

Louisiana
 2. Allen J. Ellender (D)
 3. John H. Overton (D), until May 14, 1948
 William C. Feazel (D), May 18, 1948 – December 30, 1948
 Russell B. Long (D), from December 31, 1948

Maine
 1. Owen Brewster (R)
 2. Wallace H. White Jr. (R)

Maryland
 1. Herbert O'Conor (D)
 3. Millard Tydings (D)

Massachusetts
 1. Henry Cabot Lodge Jr. (R)
 2. Leverett Saltonstall (R)

Michigan
 1. Arthur Vandenberg (R)
 2. Homer S. Ferguson (R)

Minnesota
 1. Edward John Thye (R)
 2. Joseph H. Ball (R)

Mississippi
 1. Theodore G. Bilbo (D), until August 21, 1947
 John C. Stennis (D), from November 17, 1947
 2. James Eastland (D)

Missouri
 1. James P. Kem (R)
 3. Forrest C. Donnell (R)

Montana
 1. Zales Ecton (R)
 2. James E. Murray (D)

Nebraska
 1. Hugh A. Butler (R)
 2. Kenneth S. Wherry (R)

Nevada
 1. George W. Malone (R)
 3. Pat McCarran (D)

New Hampshire
 2. Styles Bridges (R)
 3. Charles W. Tobey (R)

New Jersey
 1. Howard Alexander Smith (R)
 2. Albert W. Hawkes (R)

New Mexico
 1. Dennis Chávez (D)
 2. Carl Hatch (D)

New York
 1. Irving Ives (R)
 3. Robert F. Wagner (D)

North Carolina
 2. William B. Umstead (D), until December 30, 1948
 J. Melville Broughton (D), from December 31, 1948
 3. Clyde R. Hoey (D)

North Dakota
 1. William Langer (R-NPL)
 3. Milton Young (R)

Ohio
 1. John W. Bricker (R)
 3. Robert A. Taft (R)

Oklahoma
 2. Edward H. Moore (R)
 3. Elmer Thomas (D)

Oregon
 2. Guy Cordon (R)
 3. Wayne Morse (R)

Pennsylvania
 1. Edward Martin (R)
 3. Francis J. Myers (D)

Rhode Island
 1. J. Howard McGrath (D)
 2. Theodore F. Green (D)

South Carolina
 2. Burnet R. Maybank (D)
 3. Olin D. Johnston (D)

South Dakota
 2. Harlan J. Bushfield (R), until September 27, 1948
 Vera C. Bushfield (R), October 6, 1948 – December 26, 1948
 Karl E. Mundt (R), from December 31, 1948
 3. John Chandler Gurney (R)

Tennessee
 1. Kenneth McKellar (D)
 2. Tom Stewart (D)

Texas
 1. Tom Connally (D)
 2. W. Lee O'Daniel (D)

Utah
 1. Arthur Vivian Watkins (R)
 3. Elbert D. Thomas (D)

Vermont
 1. Ralph Flanders (R)
 3. George Aiken (R)

Virginia
 1. Harry F. Byrd (D)
 2. Absalom Willis Robertson (D)

Washington
 1. Harry P. Cain (R)
 3. Warren Magnuson (D)

West Virginia
 1. Harley M. Kilgore (D)
 2. Chapman Revercomb (R)

Wisconsin
 1. Joseph McCarthy (R)
 3. Alexander Wiley (R)

Wyoming
 1. Joseph C. O'Mahoney (D)
 2. Edward V. Robertson (R)

House of Representatives
The names of members of the House of Representatives elected statewide at-large, are preceded by an "At-Large," and the names of those elected from districts, whether plural or single member, are preceded by their district numbers.

The congressional district numbers are linked to articles describing the district itself. Since the boundaries of the districts have changed often and substantially, the linked article may only describe the district as it exists today, and not as it was at the time of this Congress.

Alabama 
 . Frank W. Boykin (D)
 . George M. Grant (D)
 . George W. Andrews (D)
 . Sam Hobbs (D)
 . Albert Rains (D)
 . Pete Jarman (D)
 . Carter Manasco (D)
 . Robert E. Jones Jr. (D), from January 28, 1947
 . Laurie C. Battle (D)

Arizona 
 . John R. Murdock (D)
 . Richard F. Harless (D)

Arkansas 
 . Ezekiel C. Gathings (D)
 . Wilbur Mills (D)
 . James William Trimble (D)
 . William Fadjo Cravens (D)
 . Brooks Hays (D)
 . William F. Norrell (D)
 . Oren Harris (D)

California 
 . Clarence F. Lea (D)
 . Clair Engle (D)
 . J. Leroy Johnson (R)
 . Franck R. Havenner (D)
 . Richard J. Welch (R)
 . George P. Miller (D)
 . John J. Allen Jr. (R)
 . Jack Z. Anderson (R)
 . Bertrand W. Gearhart (R)
 . Alfred J. Elliott (D)
 . Ernest K. Bramblett (R)
 . Richard Nixon (R)
 . Norris Poulson (R)
 . Helen Gahagan Douglas (D)
 . Gordon L. McDonough (R)
 . Donald L. Jackson (R)
 . Cecil R. King (D)
 . Willis W. Bradley (R)
 . Chester E. Holifield (D)
 . John Carl Hinshaw (R)
 . Harry R. Sheppard (D)
 . John R. Phillips (R)
 . Charles K. Fletcher (R)

Colorado 
 . John A. Carroll (D)
 . William S. Hill (R)
 . John Chenoweth (R)
 . Robert F. Rockwell (R)

Connecticut 
 . Antoni Sadlak (R)
 . William J. Miller (R)
 . Horace Seely-Brown Jr. (R)
 . Ellsworth Foote (R)
 . John Davis Lodge (R)
 . James T. Patterson (R)

Delaware 
 . J. Caleb Boggs (R)

Florida 
 . J. Hardin Peterson (D)
 . Emory H. Price (D)
 . Bob Sikes (D)
 . George Smathers (D)
 . Joe Hendricks (D)
 . Dwight L. Rogers (D)

Georgia 
 . Prince Hulon Preston Jr. (D)
 . Edward E. Cox (D)
 . Stephen Pace (D)
 . Albert Sidney Camp (D)
 . James C. Davis (D)
 . Carl Vinson (D)
 . Henderson Lovelace Lanham (D)
 . William McDonald Wheeler (D)
 . John Stephens Wood (D)
 . Paul Brown (D)

Idaho 
 . Abe Goff (R)
 . John C. Sanborn (R)

Illinois 
 . William Stratton (R)
 . William L. Dawson (D)
 . Richard B. Vail (R)
 . Fred E. Busbey (R)
 . Martin Gorski (D)
 . Adolph J. Sabath (D)
 . Thomas J. O'Brien (D)
 . Thomas L. Owens (R), until June 7, 1948, vacant thereafter
 . Thomas S. Gordon (D)
 . Robert Twyman (R)
 . Ralph E. Church (R)
 . Chauncey W. Reed (R)
 . Noah M. Mason (R)
 . Leo E. Allen (R)
 . Anton J. Johnson (R)
 . Robert B. Chiperfield (R)
 . Everett Dirksen (R)
 . Leslie C. Arends (R)
 . Edward H. Jenison (R)
 . Rolla C. McMillen (R)
 . Sid Simpson (R)
 . George Evan Howell (R), until October 5, 1947, vacant thereafter
 . Melvin Price (D)
 . Charles W. Vursell (R)
 . Roy Clippinger (R)
 . C. W. Bishop (R)

Indiana 
 . Ray Madden (D)
 . Charles A. Halleck (R)
 . Robert A. Grant (R)
 . George W. Gillie (R)
 . Forest A. Harness (R)
 . Noble J. Johnson (R), until July 1, 1948, vacant for remainder of term
 . Gerald W. Landis (R)
 . E. A. Mitchell (R)
 . Earl Wilson (R)
 . Raymond S. Springer (R), until August 28, 1947
 Ralph Harvey (R), from November 4, 1947
 . Louis Ludlow (D)

Iowa 
 . Thomas E. Martin (R)
 . Henry O. Talle (R)
 . John W. Gwynne (R)
 . Karl M. LeCompte (R)
 . Paul Cunningham (R)
 . James I. Dolliver (R)
 . Ben F. Jensen (R)
 . Charles B. Hoeven (R)

Kansas 
 . Albert M. Cole (R)
 . Errett P. Scrivner (R)
 . Herbert Alton Meyer (R)
 . Edward Herbert Rees (R)
 . Clifford R. Hope (R)
 . Wint Smith (R)

Kentucky 
 . Noble J. Gregory (D)
 . Earle Clements (D), until January 6, 1948
 John A. Whitaker (D), from April 17, 1948
 . Thruston Ballard Morton (R)
 . Frank Chelf (D)
 . Brent Spence (D)
 . Virgil Chapman (D)
 . Wendell H. Meade (R)
 . Joe B. Bates (D)
 . John M. Robsion (R), until February 17, 1948
 William Lewis (R), from April 24, 1948

Louisiana 
 . F. Edward Hébert (D)
 . Hale Boggs (D)
 . James R. Domengeaux (D)
 . Overton Brooks (D)
 . Otto Passman (D)
 . James H. Morrison (D)
 . Henry D. Larcade Jr. (D)
 . A. Leonard Allen (D)

Maine 
 . Robert Hale (R)
 . Margaret Chase Smith (R)
 . Frank Fellows (R)

Maryland 
 . Edward Tylor Miller (R)
 . Hugh Meade (D)
 . Thomas D'Alesandro Jr. (D), until May 16, 1947
 : . Edward Garmatz (D), from July 15, 1947
 . George Hyde Fallon (D)
 . Lansdale G. Sasscer (D)
 . James Glenn Beall (R)

Massachusetts 
 . John W. Heselton (R)
 . Charles Clason (R)
 . Philip J. Philbin (D)
 . Harold Donohue (D)
 . Edith Nourse Rogers (R)
 . George J. Bates (R)
 . Thomas J. Lane (D)
 . Angier Goodwin (R)
 . Charles L. Gifford (R), until August 23, 1947
 : . Donald W. Nicholson (R), from November 18, 1947
 . Christian Herter (R)
 . John F. Kennedy (D)
 . John W. McCormack (D)
 . Richard B. Wigglesworth (R)
 . Joseph W. Martin Jr. (R)

Michigan 
 . George G. Sadowski (D)
 . Earl C. Michener (R)
 . Paul W. Shafer (R)
 . Clare Hoffman (R)
 . Bartel J. Jonkman (R)
 . William W. Blackney (R)
 . Jesse P. Wolcott (R)
 . Fred L. Crawford (R)
 . Albert J. Engel (R)
 . Roy O. Woodruff (R)
 . Frederick Van Ness Bradley (R), until May 24, 1947
 Charles E. Potter (R), from August 26, 1947
 . John B. Bennett (R)
 . Howard A. Coffin (R)
 . Harold F. Youngblood (R)
 . John Dingell Sr. (D)
 . John Lesinski Sr. (D)
 . George Anthony Dondero (R)

Minnesota 
 . August H. Andresen (R)
 . Joseph P. O'Hara (R)
 . George MacKinnon (R)
 . Edward Devitt (R)
 . Walter Judd (R)
 . Harold Knutson (R)
 . Herman Carl Andersen (R)
 . John Blatnik (DFL)
 . Harold Hagen (R)

Mississippi 
 . John E. Rankin (D)
 . Jamie Whitten (D)
 . William Madison Whittington (D)
 . Thomas Abernethy (D)
 . W. Arthur Winstead (D)
 . William M. Colmer (D)
 . John Bell Williams (D)

Missouri 
 . Samuel W. Arnold (R)
 . Max Schwabe (R)
 . William Clay Cole (R)
 . C. Jasper Bell (D)
 . Albert L. Reeves Jr. (R)
 . Marion T. Bennett (R)
 . Dewey Jackson Short (R)
 . Parke M. Banta (R)
 . Clarence Cannon (D)
 . Orville Zimmerman (D), until April 7, 1948
 Paul C. Jones (D), from November 2, 1948
 . Claude I. Bakewell (R)
 . Walter C. Ploeser (R)
 . Frank M. Karsten (D)

Montana 
 . Mike Mansfield (D)
 . Wesley A. D'Ewart (R)

Nebraska 
 . Carl Curtis (R)
 . Howard Buffett (R)
 . Karl Stefan (R)
 . Arthur L. Miller (R)

Nevada 
 . Charles H. Russell (R)

New Hampshire 
 . Chester Earl Merrow (R)
 . Norris Cotton (R)

New Jersey 
 . Charles A. Wolverton (R)
 . T. Millet Hand (R)
 . James C. Auchincloss (R)
 . Frank A. Mathews Jr. (R)
 . Charles A. Eaton (R)
 . Clifford P. Case (R)
 . J. Parnell Thomas (R)
 . Gordon Canfield (R)
 . Harry L. Towe (R)
 . Fred A. Hartley Jr. (R)
 . Frank Sundstrom (R)
 . Robert Kean (R)
 . Mary Teresa Norton (D)
 . Edward J. Hart (D)

New Mexico 
 . Georgia Lee Lusk (D)
 . Antonio M. Fernández (D)

New York 
 . W. Kingsland Macy (R)
 . Leonard W. Hall (R)
 . Henry J. Latham (R)
 . Gregory McMahon (R)
 . Robert Tripp Ross (R)
 . Robert Nodar Jr. (R)
 . John J. Delaney (D), until November 18, 1948
 Vacant thereafter
 . Joseph L. Pfeifer (D)
 . Eugene James Keogh (D)
 . Andrew Lawrence Somers (D)
 . James J. Heffernan (D)
 . John J. Rooney (D)
 . Donald Lawrence O'Toole (D)
 . Leo F. Rayfiel (D), until September 13, 1947
 Abraham J. Multer (D), from November 4, 1947
 . Emanuel Celler (D)
 . Ellsworth B. Buck (R)
 . Frederic René Coudert Jr. (R)
 . Vito Marcantonio (AL)
 . Arthur George Klein (D)
 . Sol Bloom (D)
 . Jacob Javits (R)
 . Adam Clayton Powell Jr. (D)
 . Walter A. Lynch (D)
 . Benjamin J. Rabin (D), until December 31, 1947
 Leo Isacson (AL), from February 17, 1948
 . Charles A. Buckley (D)
 . David M. Potts (R)
 . Ralph W. Gwinn (R)
 . Ralph A. Gamble (R)
 . Katharine St. George (R)
 . Jay Le Fevre (R)
 . Bernard W. Kearney (R)
 . William T. Byrne (D)
 . Dean P. Taylor (R)
 . Clarence E. Kilburn (R)
 . Hadwen C. Fuller (R)
 . R. Walter Riehlman (R)
 . Edwin Arthur Hall (R)
 . John Taber (R)
 . W. Sterling Cole (R)
 . Kenneth Keating (R)
 . James Wolcott Wadsworth Jr. (R)
 . Walter G. Andrews (R)
 . Edward J. Elsaesser (R)
 . John Cornelius Butler (R)
 . Daniel A. Reed (R)

North Carolina 
 . Herbert Covington Bonner (D)
 . John H. Kerr (D)
 . Graham A. Barden (D)
 . Harold D. Cooley (D)
 . John Hamlin Folger (D)
 . Carl T. Durham (D)
 . J. Bayard Clark (D)
 . Charles B. Deane (D)
 . Robert L. Doughton (D)
 . Hamilton C. Jones (D)
 . Alfred L. Bulwinkle (D)
 . Monroe Minor Redden (D)

North Dakota 
 . William Lemke (R-NPL)
 . Charles R. Robertson (R)

Ohio 
 . George H. Bender (R)
 . Charles H. Elston (R)
 . William E. Hess (R)
 . Raymond H. Burke (R)
 . Robert Franklin Jones (R), until September 2, 1947
 William Moore McCulloch (R), from November 4, 1947
 . Cliff Clevenger (R)
 . Edward O. McCowen (R)
 . Clarence J. Brown (R)
 . Frederick C. Smith (R)
 . Homer A. Ramey (R)
 . Thomas A. Jenkins (R)
 . Walter E. Brehm (R)
 . John Martin Vorys (R)
 . Alvin F. Weichel (R)
 . Walter B. Huber (D)
 . Percy W. Griffiths (R)
 . Henderson H. Carson (R)
 . J. Harry McGregor (R)
 . Earl R. Lewis (R)
 . Michael J. Kirwan (D)
 . Michael A. Feighan (D)
 . Robert Crosser (D)
 . Frances P. Bolton (R)

Oklahoma 
 . George B. Schwabe (R)
 . William G. Stigler (D)
 . Carl Albert (D)
 . Glen D. Johnson (D)
 . Mike Monroney (D)
 . Toby Morris (D)
 . Preston E. Peden (D)
 . Ross Rizley (R)

Oregon 
 . A. Walter Norblad (R)
 . Lowell Stockman (R)
 . Homer D. Angell (R)
 . Harris Ellsworth (R)

Pennsylvania 
 . James A. Gallagher (R)
 . Robert N. McGarvey (R)
 . Hardie Scott (R)
 . Franklin J. Maloney (R)
 . George W. Sarbacher Jr. (R)
 . Hugh Scott (R)
 . E. Wallace Chadwick (R)
 . Charles L. Gerlach (R), until May 5, 1947
 Franklin H. Lichtenwalter (R), from September 9, 1947
 . Paul B. Dague (R)
 . James P. Scoblick (R)
 . Mitchell Jenkins (R)
 . Ivor D. Fenton (R)
 . Frederick Augustus Muhlenberg (R)
 . Wilson D. Gillette (R)
 . Robert F. Rich  (R)
 . Samuel K. McConnell Jr. (R)
 . Richard M. Simpson (R)
 . John C. Kunkel (R)
 . Leon H. Gavin (R)
 . Francis E. Walter (D)
 . Chester H. Gross (R)
 . James E. Van Zandt (R)
 . William J. Crow (R)
 . Thomas E. Morgan (D)
 . Louis E. Graham (R)
 . Harve Tibbott (R)
 . Augustine B. Kelley (D)
 . Carroll D. Kearns (R)
 . John McDowell (R)
 . Robert J. Corbett (R)
 . James G. Fulton (R)
 . Herman P. Eberharter (D)
 . Frank Buchanan (D)

Rhode Island 
 . Aime Forand (D)
 . John E. Fogarty (D)

South Carolina 
 . L. Mendel Rivers (D)
 . John J. Riley (D)
 . William Jennings Bryan Dorn (D)
 . Joseph R. Bryson (D)
 . James P. Richards (D)
 . John L. McMillan (D)

South Dakota 
 . Karl E. Mundt (R), until December 30, 1948, vacant thereafter
 . Francis H. Case (R)

Tennessee 
 . Dayton E. Phillips (R)
 . John Jennings (R)
 . Estes Kefauver (D)
 . Albert Gore Sr. (D)
 . Joe L. Evins (D)
 . Percy Priest (D)
 . W. Wirt Courtney (D)
 . Tom J. Murray (D)
 . Jere Cooper (D)
 . Clifford Davis (D)

Texas 
 . Wright Patman (D)
 . Jesse M. Combs (D)
 . Lindley Beckworth (D)
 . Sam Rayburn (D)
 . Joseph Franklin Wilson (D)
 . Olin E. Teague (D)
 . Tom Pickett (D)
 . Albert Thomas (D)
 . Joseph J. Mansfield (D), until July 12, 1947
 Clark W. Thompson (D), from August 23, 1947
 . Lyndon B. Johnson (D)
 . William R. Poage (D)
 . Wingate H. Lucas (D)
 . Ed Gossett (D)
 . John E. Lyle Jr. (D)
 . Milton H. West (D), until October 28, 1948
 Lloyd Bentsen (D), from December 4, 1948
 . R. Ewing Thomason (D), until July 31, 1947
 Kenneth M. Regan (D), from August 23, 1947
 . Omar Burleson (D)
 . Eugene Worley (D)
 . George H. Mahon (D)
 . Paul J. Kilday (D)
 . O. C. Fisher (D)

Utah 
 . Walter K. Granger (D)
 . William A. Dawson (R)

Vermont 
 . Charles Albert Plumley (R)

Virginia 
 . S. Otis Bland (D)
 . Porter Hardy Jr. (D)
 . J. Vaughan Gary (D)
 . Patrick H. Drewry (D), until December 21, 1947
 Watkins Moorman Abbitt (D), from February 17, 1948
 . Thomas B. Stanley (D)
 . J. Lindsay Almond (D), until April 17, 1948
 Clarence G. Burton (D), from November 2, 1948
 . Burr Harrison (D)
 . Howard W. Smith (D)
 . John W. Flannagan Jr. (D)

Washington 
 . Homer Jones (R)
 . Henry M. Jackson (D)
 . Fred B. Norman (R), until April 18, 1947
 Russell V. Mack (R), from June 7, 1947
 . Hal Holmes (R)
 . Walt Horan (R)
 . Thor C. Tollefson (R)

West Virginia 
 . Francis J. Love (R)
 . Melvin C. Snyder (R)
 . Edward G. Rohrbough (R)
 . Hubert S. Ellis (R)
 . John Kee (D)
 . E. H. Hedrick (D)

Wisconsin 
 . Lawrence H. Smith (R)
 . Glenn Robert Davis (R), from April 22, 1947
 . William H. Stevenson (R)
 . John C. Brophy (R)
 . Charles J. Kersten (R)
 . Frank B. Keefe (R)
 . Reid F. Murray (R)
 . John W. Byrnes (R)
 . Merlin Hull (R)
 . Alvin O'Konski (R)

Wyoming 
 . Frank A. Barrett (R)

Non-voting members 
 . Bob Bartlett (D)
 . Joseph Rider Farrington (R)
 . Antonio Fernós-Isern (Resident Commissioner) (PPD)

Changes in membership 
The count below reflects changes from the beginning of the first session of this Congress

Senate 
There were 3 deaths, 2 resignations, and one lost mid-term election.

|-
| Mississippi(1)
|  | Theodore G. Bilbo (D)
| Died August 21, 1947.Successor was elected November 17, 1947.
|  | John C. Stennis (D)
| November 17, 1947

|-
| Louisiana(3)
|  | John H. Overton (D)
| Died May 14, 1948.Successor was appointed to continue the term.
|  | William C. Feazel (D)
| May 18, 1948

|-
| South Dakota(2)
|  | Harlan J. Bushfield (R)
| Died September 27, 1948.Successor was appointed to finish the term.
|  | Vera C. Bushfield (R)
| October 6, 1948

|-
| South Dakota(2)
|  | Vera C. Bushfield (R)
| Interim appointee resigned December 26, 1948.Successor was appointed to finish the term.
|  | Karl E. Mundt (R)
| December 31, 1948

|-
| Louisiana(3)
|  | William C. Feazel (D)
| Interim appointee retired when successor elected.Successor was elected December 31, 1948.
|  | Russell B. Long (D)
| December 31, 1948

|-
| North Carolina(2)
|  | William B. Umstead (D)
| Interim appointee lost election to finish the term.Successor was elected December 31, 1948.
|  | J. Melville Broughton (D)
| December 31, 1948

|}

House of Representatives 
There were 9 deaths and 7 resignations.

|-
| 
| Vacant
| style="font-size:80%" | John Sparkman resigned in previous Congress after being elected to the US Senate having been re-elected as well.
|  | Robert E. Jones Jr. (D)
| Seated January 28, 1947
|-
| 
| Vacant
| style="font-size:80%" | Representative Robert Kirkland Henry died during previous Congress having been previously re-elected.
|  | Glenn Robert Davis (R)
| Seated April 22, 1947
|-
| 
|  | Fred B. Norman (R)
| style="font-size:80%" | Died April 18, 1947
|  | Russell V. Mack (R)
| Seated June 7, 1947
|-
| 
|  | Charles L. Gerlach (R)
| style="font-size:80%" | Died May 5, 1947
|  | Franklin H. Lichtenwalter (R)
| Seated September 9, 1947
|-
| 
|  | Thomas D'Alesandro Jr. (D)
| style="font-size:80%" | Resigned May 16, 1947, after being elected Mayor of Baltimore
|  | Edward Garmatz (D)
| Seated July 15, 1947
|-
| 
|  | Frederick Van Ness Bradley (R)
| style="font-size:80%" | Died May 24, 1947
|  | Charles E. Potter (R)
| Seated August 26, 1947
|-
| 
|  | Joseph J. Mansfield (D)
| style="font-size:80%" | Died July 12, 1947
|  | Clark W. Thompson (D)
| Seated August 23, 1947
|-
| 
|  | R. Ewing Thomason (D)
| style="font-size:80%" | Resigned July 31, 1947, after being appointed as a judge of the US District Court for the Western District of Texas
|  | Kenneth M. Regan (D)
| Seated August 23, 1947
|-
| 
|  | Charles L. Gifford (R)
| style="font-size:80%" | Died August 23, 1947
|  | Donald W. Nicholson (R)
| Seated November 18, 1947
|-
| 
|  | Raymond S. Springer (R)
| style="font-size:80%" | Died August 28, 1947
|  | Ralph Harvey (R)
| Seated November 4, 1947
|-
| 
|  | Robert Franklin Jones (R)
| style="font-size:80%" | Resigned September 2, 1947, to become a member of the Federal Communications Commission
|  | William Moore McCulloch (R)
| Seated November 4, 1947
|-
| 
|  | Leo F. Rayfiel (D)
| style="font-size:80%" | Resigned September 13, 1947,  having been appointed a judge of the United States District Court for the Eastern District of New York
|  | Abraham J. Multer (D)
| Seated November 4, 1947
|-
| 
|  | George Evan Howell (R)
| style="font-size:80%" | Resigned October 5, 1947, after being appointed judge of the US Court of Claims
| colspan=2 | Vacant until next Congress
|-
| 
|  | Patrick H. Drewry (D)
| style="font-size:80%" | Died December 21, 1947
|  | Watkins Moorman Abbitt (D)
| Seated February 17, 1948
|-
| 
|  | Benjamin J. Rabin (D)
| style="font-size:80%" | Resigned December 31, 1947
|  | Leo Isacson (AL)
| Seated February 17, 1948
|-
| 
|  | Earle Clements (D)
| style="font-size:80%" | Resigned January 6, 1948, to become Governor of Kentucky
|  | John A. Whitaker (D)
| Seated April 17, 1948
|-
| 
|  | John M. Robsion (R)
| style="font-size:80%" | Died February 17, 1948
|  | William Lewis (R)
| Seated April 24, 1948
|-
| 
|  | Orville Zimmerman (D)
| style="font-size:80%" | Died April 7, 1948
|  | Paul C. Jones (D)
| Seated November 2, 1948
|-
| 
|  | J. Lindsay Almond (D)
| style="font-size:80%" | Resigned April 17, 1948, having been elected attorney General of Virginia
|  | Clarence G. Burton (D)
| Seated November 2, 1948
|-
| 
|  | Thomas L. Owens (R)
| style="font-size:80%" | Died June 7, 1948
| colspan=2 | Vacant until next Congress
|-
| 
|  | Noble J. Johnson (R)
| style="font-size:80%" | Resigned July 1, 1948, after being appointed as judge of US Court of Customs & Patent Appeals
| colspan=2 | Vacant until next Congress
|-
| 
|  | Milton H. West (D)
| style="font-size:80%" | Died October 28, 1948
|  | Lloyd Bentsen (D)
| Seated December 4, 1948
|-
| 
|  | John J. Delaney (D)
| style="font-size:80%" | Died November 18, 1948
| colspan=2 | Vacant until next Congress
|-
| 
|  | Karl E. Mundt (R)
| style="font-size:80%" | Resigned December 30, 1948, after being appointed to the U.S. Senate having already been elected.
| colspan=2 | Vacant until next Congress
|}

Committees

Senate

 Agriculture and Forestry (Chairman: Arthur Capper; Ranking Member: Elmer Thomas)
 Appropriations (Chairman: Styles Bridges; Ranking Member: Kenneth McKellar)
 Armed Services (Chairman: Chan Gurney; Ranking Member: Millard E. Tydings)
 Banking and Currency (Chairman: Charles W. Tobey; Ranking Member: Robert F. Wagner)
 Civil Service (Chairman: William Langer; Ranking Member: Dennis Chavez)
 District of Columbia (Chairman: C. Douglass Buck; Ranking Member: N/A)
 Expenditures in Executive Departments (Chairman: George D. Aiken; Ranking Member: John L. McClellan)
 Finance (Chairman: Eugene D. Millikin; Ranking Member: Walter F. George)
 Foreign Relations (Chairman: Arthur H. Vandenberg; Ranking Member: Tom Connally)
 Interstate and Foreign Commerce (Chairman: Wallace H. White Jr.; Ranking Member: Edwin C. Johnson)
 Investigate the National Defense Program (Special) (Chairman: Owen Brewster)
 Judiciary (Chairman: Alexander Wiley; Ranking Member: Pat McCarran)
 Labor and Public Welfare (Chairman: Robert A. Taft; Ranking Member: Elbert D. Thomas)
 Petroleum Resources (Special)
 Public Lands (Chairman: Hugh A. Butler; Ranking Member: Carl A. Hatch)
 Public Works (Chairman: W. Chapman Revercomb; Ranking Member: John H. Overton)
 Remodeling the Senate Chamber (Special)
 Rules and Administration (Chairman: C. Wayland Brooks; Ranking Member: Carl Hayden)
 Small Business Enterprises (Special) (Chairman: Kenneth S. Wherry)
 Whole

House of Representatives

 Agriculture (Chairman: Clifford R. Hope; Ranking Member: John W. Flannagan Jr.)
 Appropriations (Chairman: John Taber; Ranking Member: Clarence Cannon)
 Armed Services (Chairman: Walter G. Andrews; Ranking Member: Carl Vinson)
 Banking and Currency (Chairman: Jesse P. Wolcott; Ranking Member: Brent Spence)
 District of Columbia (Chairman: Everett M. Dirksen; Ranking Member: John L. McMillan)
 Education and Labor (Chairman: Fred A. Hartley Jr.; Ranking Member: John Lesinski)
 Expenditures in the Executive Departments (Chairman: Clare E. Hoffman; Ranking Member: Carter Manasco)
 Foreign Affairs (Chairman: Charles Aubrey Eaton; Ranking Member: Sol Bloom)
 Foreign Aid (Select) (Chairman: Charles Aubrey Eaton)
 House Administration (Chairman: Karl M. LeCompte; Ranking Member: Mary Teresa Norton)
 Investigate Commodity Transactions (Select) (Chairman: August H. Andresen)
 Investigate Federal Communications Commission (Select) (Chairman: Forest A. Harness)
 Interstate and Foreign Commerce (Chairman: Charles A. Wolverton; Ranking Member: Clarence F. Lea)
 Judiciary (Chairman: Earl C. Michener; Ranking Member: Emanuel Celler)
 Merchant Marine and Fisheries (Chairman: Alvin F. Weichel; Ranking Member: S. Otis Bland)
 Newsprint and Paper Supply (Select) (Chairman: N/A; Ranking Member: N/A)
 Post Office and Civil Service (Chairman: Edward H. Rees; Ranking Member: Tom J. Murray)
 Public Lands (Chairman: Richard J. Welch; Ranking Member: Andrew L. Somers)
 Public Works (Chairman: George Anthony Dondero; Ranking Member: Joseph J. Mansfield then William M. Whittington)
 Rules (Chairman: Leo E. Allen; Ranking Member: Adolph J. Sabath)
 Small Business (Select) (Chairman: Walter C. Ploeser)
 Standards of Official Conduct
 Un-American Activities (Chairman: J. Parnell Thomas; Ranking Member: John S. Wood) 
 Veterans' Affairs (Chairman: Edith Nourse Rogers; Ranking Member: John E. Rankin)
 Ways and Means (Chairman: Harold Knutson; Ranking Member: Robert L. Doughton)
 Whole

Joint committees

 Atomic Energy (Chairman: Sen. Bourke B. Hickenlooper; Vice Chairman: Rep. W. Sterling Cole)  
 Conditions of Indian Tribes (Special)
 Economic (Chairman: Sen. Robert A. Taft; Vice Chairman: Rep. Jesse P. Wolcott)  
 Disposition of Executive Papers
 Foreign Economic Cooperation
 Housing
 Labor Management Relations
 Legislative Budget
 The Library (Chairman: Sen. C. Wayland Brooks)
 To Study Pacific Islands
 Printing (Chairman: Sen. William E. Jenner; Vice Chairman: Rep. Karl M. LeCompte)
 Reduction of Nonessential Federal Expenditures (Chairman: Sen. Harry F. Byrd; Vice Chairman: Rep. Robert L. Doughton)
 Selective Service Deferments
 Taxation (Chairman: Rep. Harold Knutson; Vice Chairman: Sen. Eugene D. Millikin)

Employees

Legislative branch agency directors
 Architect of the Capitol: David Lynn
 Attending Physician of the United States Congress: George Calver
 Comptroller General of the United States: Lindsay C. Warren
 Librarian of Congress: Luther H. Evans 
 Public Printer of the United States: Augustus E. Giegengack, until 1948 
 John J. Deviny, from 1948

Senate
 Chaplain: Peter Marshall (Presbyterian)
 Parliamentarian: Charles Watkins
 Secretary: Carl A. Loeffler
 Librarian: George W. Straubinger
 Secretary for the Majority: J. Mark Trice
 Secretary for the Minority: Felton McLellan Johnston
 Sergeant at Arms:  Edward F. McGinnis

House of Representatives
 Chaplain: James Shera Montgomery (Methodist)
 Clerk: John Andrews
 Doorkeeper: M. L. Meletio
 Parliamentarian: Lewis Deschler
 Postmaster: Frank W. Collier, until October 15, 1948; vacant thereafter
 Reading Clerks: George J. Maurer (D) and Alney E. Chaffee (R)
 Sergeant at Arms: William F. Russell

See also 
 1946 United States elections (elections leading to this Congress)
 1946 United States Senate elections
 1946 United States House of Representatives elections
 1948 United States elections (elections during this Congress, leading to the next Congress)
 1948 United States presidential election
 1948 United States Senate elections
 1948 United States House of Representatives elections
 Turnip Day Session (July–August 1948)

Notes

External links
Error